Huasahuasi District is one of nine districts of the province Tarma in Peru.

See also 
 Pampa Hermosa Reserved Zone
 Qanchisqucha
 Rumi Pukyu
 Waskaqucha (Huasahuasi, Huacuas)
 Waskaqucha (Huasahuasi, San Antonio)

References